The Roman Catholic Diocese of Ibarra is a diocese located in the city of Ibarra in the Ecclesiastical province of Quito in Ecuador.

Churches
Basílica de Nuestra Señora de La Merced

Bishops

Ordinaries
José Ignacio Checa y Barbo (6 August 1866 – 16 March 1868), appointed Archbishop of Quito
Antonio Tommaso Yturalde (25 June 1869 –1 July 1876)
Pedro Rafael González (Gonsález) (29 September 1876 – 15 June 1893), appointed Coadjutor Archbishop of Quito 
Federico Gonsález y Suárez (30 July 1895 – 14 December 1905), appointed Archbishop of Quito
Ulpiano Maria Perez y Quinones (8 May 1907 – 7 December 1916), appointed Bishop of Bolivar
Alberto Maria Ordóñez Crespo (4 December 1916 – 5 December 1930), appointed Bishop of Bolivar
Alessandro Pasquel (18 December 1931 – 18 September 1934)
Cesar Antonio Mosquera Corral (18 September 1936 – 11 October 1954), appointed Bishop of Guayaquil 
Silvio Luis Haro Alvear (23 March 1955 – 28 June 1980)
Juan Ignacio Larrea Holguín (28 June 1980 – 5 August 1983), appointed Bishop of Ecuador, Military
Luis Oswaldo Pérez Calderón (21 August 1984 – 22 September 1989)
Antonio Arregui Yarza (25 July 1995 – 7 May 2003), appointed Archbishop of Guayaquil
Julio César Terán Dutari, S.J. (14 February 2004 – 25 March 2011)
Valter Dario Maggi (25 March 2011 – 13 October 2018)
Segundo René Coba Galarza (12 December 2019 – present)

Other priests of this diocese who became bishops
Nicanor Carlos Gavinales Chamorro, appointed Bishop of Portoviejo (Porto Vecchio) in 1947
Guido Iván Minda Chalá, appointed Auxiliary Bishop of Guayaquil in 2009
Geovanni Mauricio Paz Hurtado, appointed Bishop of Latacunga in 2016

References

External links
 GCatholic.org
 Catholic Hierarchy

Roman Catholic dioceses in Ecuador
Roman Catholic Ecclesiastical Province of Quito
Religious organizations established in 1862
Roman Catholic dioceses and prelatures established in the 19th century
1862 establishments in Ecuador